Bridging the Distance: a Portland, OR covers compilation is a compilation album released April 17, 2007 by Arena Rock Recording Co. to benefit p:ear.

Track listing

Bonus tracks (available in digital format only)

Footnotes

External links
Bridging the Distance at Arena Rock Recording Co.
Bridging the Distance at tinymixtapes.com
Bridging the Distance at pitchforkmedia.com
Bridging The Distance at nme.com

Regional music compilation albums
Covers albums
2007 compilation albums
Arena Rock Recording Company compilation albums